Story of Drunken Master aka Zui xia Su Qi Er / Drunken Fist Boxing is a 1979 Hong Kong martial arts film.  Simon Yuen stars as Beggar So.  Also featured are Casanova Wong and Pan-pan Yeung.

Plot 

Beggar So (Yuen Siu-tien) is trying to pass on his Kung fu to a brother and sister (Chung and Gam Fa Pan-pan Yeung) team together with mixed style. A past enemy of Beggar So, Grasshopper Bill Chan (Yen Shi-Kwan) and his brother Cougar start causing trouble for him and causing him to be thrown out of his house. Grasshopper Bill helps Kai to be pledged in marriage to Gam Fa against her wishes, but secretly he wants to keep her all to himself, which leads to the final death battle.

Cast 
Yuen Siu-tien as Beggar So
Sharon Yeung as Gam Fa
Yen Shi-Kwan as Grasshopper Bill Chan
Kwai Shan as Cougar
Casanova Wong as Chi Wai

External links 
 

1979 films
1970s Cantonese-language films
Mandarin-language films
Kung fu films
Hong Kong martial arts films
1970s Hong Kong films